Danny Fitzgerald (1961 – 10 January 2010) was an Irish sportsperson.  A dual player at the highest levels, he played hurling and Gaelic football with his local club Claughaun and was a member of the Limerick senior inter-county teams in both codes between 1983 and 1993.

References

 

1961 births
2010 deaths
Claughaun hurlers
Claughaun Gaelic footballers
Dual players
Limerick inter-county hurlers
Limerick inter-county Gaelic footballers
Munster inter-provincial hurlers
Munster inter-provincial Gaelic footballers